The Railway Clearing House (RCH) was an organisation set up to manage the allocation of revenue collected by pre-grouping railway companies for the conveyance of passengers and goods over the lines (or using the rolling stock) of other companies. It went on to become the major regulatory body overseeing the day-to-day running of railways in Great Britain and setting common standards for railway companies, which ensured their safety and interoperability. The RCH also produced fare structures governing many aspects of rail transport at a national level and set limits on price increases for passenger travel.

Rationale
When passengers travelled between two stations on the same railway, using trains provided by the same company, that company was entitled to the whole of the fare. Similarly, when goods were consigned between two stations on the same railway, using wagons provided by the same company, that company was entitled to the whole of the fee. However, when coaches or wagons owned by a different company were used, that company would be entitled to a proportion of the fare or fee. If the commencement and terminus of the journey were on different railways, a more complicated situation arose: if the two companies involved did not provide through ticketing, the passenger or goods needed to be re-booked at a junction station; if through booking was provided, the receipts collected by the first company needed to be divided between them, usually on a mileage basis. The Railway Clearing House was founded as a means by which these receipts could be apportioned fairly.

History

19th century
The Railway Clearing House commenced operations on 2 January 1842 in small offices at 111 Drummond Street opposite Euston Station, London. The premises were owned by the London and Birmingham Railway, which also provided the initial costs of setting up the organisation.

The founding members, whose first meeting was on 26 April 1842, were: the London and Birmingham Railway; the predecessors of the Midland Railway (the Midland Counties Railway, Birmingham and Derby Junction Railway, and North Midland Railway); the Manchester and Leeds Railway; and the predecessors of the North Eastern Railway (the Leeds and Selby Railway, Hull and Selby Railway, York and North Midland Railway and Great North of England Railway).

This first meeting agreed to principles by which the ongoing activities of the RCH were to be funded. This involved a fixed payment per station served (£5, reduced in 1844 to £2 for stations that were not termini) plus an apportionment of the balance of costs according to the total share of receipts of each participating company.

The first manager was Kenneth Morrison, auditor of the London and Birmingham Railway.

By the end of December 1845, more companies had joined: the Birmingham and Gloucester Railway; Chester and Birmingham Railway; the Grand Junction Railway and its allies the North Union Railway and Liverpool and Manchester Railway; the Lancaster and Preston Railway; Manchester and Birmingham Railway; and Newcastle and Carlisle Railway.

The Grand Junction Railway initially refused, because of the £300 per year cost of using Edmondson tickets, and the Liverpool and Manchester saw no need to join, being isolated from the rest of the railway system.

Owing to expansion, the RCH moved to larger purpose-built premises in Seymour Street (renamed Eversholt Street in 1938) in early 1849, which remained its headquarters for the rest of its existence. By the end of 1850 a further 21 companies had joined, including several of the leading Scottish companies, bringing the total of British railway mileage in the scheme to 55.8%. However, it still lacked the Great Western Railway and the companies south of London. In January 1863 a pneumatic tube, one-third of a mile long, was installed between the RCH and the NW Postal District Office so that "parcels or persons are blown from one end to the other in a little over a minute".

It was soon realised that the RCH provided a neutral meeting point where different railways could discuss points of disagreement and make suggestions which could benefit other railways. Besides meeting rooms, the RCH provided secretarial facilities for these discussions. Conferences between railway managers were arranged, as were conferences between the different railways' departmental heads. In this way, railways moved towards many common practices, without the need for legislation. Unfortunately, the system had a weakness, in that a unanimous vote was required for a recommendation to become compulsory.

Another function of the Railway Clearing House was to deal with lost property found in railway carriages.

In due course, the RCH was given legal status by a private Act of Parliament, the Railway Clearing Act of 25 June 1850. Although initiated by the members' companies themselves, the bill, in fact, reduced the scope of the RCH, while making it easier to enforce debt collection among members (hitherto not formally regulated). A later attempt, in 1859, via Parliament, to re-extend the powers and potential membership of the RCH, foundered on conflicting interests.

A separate organisation, the United Railway Companies' Committee, was formed in 1858 but folded in 1861. It was re-established in June 1867 and became the Railway Companies' Association (RCA) in 1869. There was a certain degree of overlap between the RCA and the RCH, and it was later agreed that the RCA should represent the railways in Parliament, whilst the RCH concentrated on organising the business of railway traffic.

In 1897, the RCH was established as a body corporate.

20th century
During both World Wars, the railways were placed under government control, and the receipts were pooled and then apportioned in fixed proportions according to pre-war receipts. During these periods, the duties of the RCH were very much reduced, but they continued to provide their secretarial functions.

As railway companies amalgamated, so the number of members reduced; until it had just one member, the British Transport Commission (BTC).

Most of the remaining powers, property, rights and liabilities were transferred to the BTC on 24 May 1954, and the RCH was dissolved as a corporate body on 8 April 1955. The BTC then continued the remaining functions of the RCH, still under the name Railway Clearing House. These included the provision of secretarial services and rooms for railway meetings, and meetings between road and rail companies; classification of goods for the setting of rates; the examination and certification of new packaging materials; the registration of rolling stock; the issue of maps and other publications including scales of charges; and the spot-check of wagons and consignments in transit. By 31 December 1959, the number of staff employed by the RCH had fallen from about 3,200 in 1921, to just 375.

The RCH was finally disbanded on 31 March 1963, when the British Railways Board (BRB) took over its surviving duties. Together with all RCH staff, these were divided mainly between the department of the Board's Chief Commercial Officer and that of its Chief Accountant.

Standards

On 22 September 1847, the RCH recommended that Greenwich Mean Time be adopted as the standard time for all railways in the United Kingdom.

The RCH went on to set technical standards for various items, such as goods wagons, to promote standardisation across the rail network.  If a wagon was described as an RCH wagon, this meant it had been built to comply with RCH standards.

The RCH set technical standards for cable connections between coaches for the remote operation of systems; they were initially used only for control of train lighting. These cables were known as RCH jumpers, and in the 1970s a system for push-pull trains was developed which used the RCH cable, eliminating the need for a separate control cable to be fitted to intermediate coaches.

The RCH produced Railway Junction Diagrams (RJDs), which show the junctions where two or more railway companies met, and the distances between these junctions and nearby stations and junctions, in order to aid the calculation of mileage-based rates. Starting in 1859 it also issued what has been described as the "most superb series of railway maps ever produced in the United Kingdom."

The RCH had some similarities to the modern Association of Train Operating Companies, and in particular, its Rail Settlement Plan division.

Notes

Bibliography

References

Diagram sources

External links
 
, contemporary description of the Railway Clearing House
, contemporary description of the work of the Railway Clearing House

History of rail transport in the United Kingdom
Standards organisations in the United Kingdom
1842 establishments in the United Kingdom
1955 disestablishments in the United Kingdom